Maria Armengol may refer to:
 Maria Antonia Armengol (born 1950), Spanish politician
 Maria Teresa Armengol, Andorran politician